MV Loch Striven is a Caledonian Maritime Assets Limited ro-ro car ferry, built in 1986 and operated by Caledonian MacBrayne. After over ten years at Largs, she spent 16 years on the Raasay crossing. Since 2014, she has been stationed on the Oban - Lismore crossing.

History
MV Loch Striven was the first of four drive-through ferries built in the 1980s by Dunston's of Hessle, to cope with increasing traffic on CalMac's smaller routes.

Layout
They have a second passenger lounge, on the port side, reducing the capacity of the car deck to 12. The wheelhouse is painted red and given a black top, as she has no funnels as such.

Service
Loch Striven joined  on the Largs–Great Cumbrae crossing in July 1986. After one month,  replaced Isle of Cumbrae. The two new vessels continued at Largs for over ten years. In 1997, Loch Striven moved to Raasay, replacing the Island Class ferry,  and remained at Raasay for 16 years. In 2013, she was displaced from Raasay by the new hybrid vessel , and following her annual overhaul on the Clyde that winter she operated the Tarbert - Portavadie/Lochranza service. In April 2014, Loch Striven returned to her original station at Largs and operated the secondary roster alongside  until June 2014, when she moved to the Oban - Lismore route.

References

Caledonian MacBrayne
1986 ships